The list of ship launches in 1927 includes a chronological list of some ships launched in 1927.


References

Sources

1927
Ship launches